The 2022 Russian Figure Skating Championships were held from 21 to 26 December 2021 in Saint Petersburg. Medals were awarded in the disciplines of men's singles, women's singles, pairs, and ice dance. The results were among the criteria used to select Russia's teams to the 2022 European Championships and 2022 Winter Olympics.

Kamila Valieva was stripped of her gold medal in Senior Women's singles after testing positive for Trimetazidine, a banned substance, on the second day of the Women's competition. Subsequently, Alexandra Trusova became the gold medalist, with Anna Shcherbakova moving up to Silver and Adeliia Petrosian receiving the Bronze medal.

Competitions 
In the 2021–22 season, Russian skaters will compete in domestic qualifying events and national championships for various age levels. The Russian Cup series will lead to three events – the Russian Championships, the Russian Junior Championships, and the Russian Cup Final.

Medalists of most important competitions

Senior Championships 
The 2022 Russian Championships were held in Saint Petersburg from 21 to 26 December 2021. Competitors qualified through international success or by competing in the Russian Cup series' senior-level events.

There are three separate basis for qualification.
1. Qualification based on receiving 2021–22 Grand Prix assignment.
2. Qualification based on qualifying for the 2021–22 Junior Grand Prix Final. However, skaters must have been born before July 1, 2007 to be qualified for the Russian senior championships. In addition, junior ice dance teams do not compete at senior national championships due to different program requirements between the junior and senior levels. Consequently, ice dance teams cannot use their junior level programs for senior competition.
3. Qualification based on Russian Cup series' results.

Schedule
Listed in local time (UTC+03:00).

Preliminary entries
The Figure Skating Federation of Russia published the official list of participants on 16 December 2021.

Changes to preliminary entries

Results

Men

Women 
 The former winner Kamila Valieva was disqualified for violation of anti-doping rules.

Pairs

Ice dance

Junior Championships
The 2022 Russian Junior Championships were held in Saransk, Mordovia on 18–22 January 2022 (originally it were scheduled on 1–5 February 2022). Competitors qualified through international success or by competing in the Russian Cup series' junior-level events. The results of the Junior Championships were supposed to be part of the selection criteria for the 2022 World Junior Championships.

There are two separate basis for qualification.
1. Qualification based on competing at the 2021–22 Junior Grand Prix series.
2. Qualification based on Russian Cup series' junior-level results.
In addition, figure skaters who were included in the official pre-season national team roster but were unable to participate at the 2021–22 Junior Grand Prix series and/or Russian Cup junior-level series due to good reasons, can be included into list of participants by decision of the Executive Committee of the Figure Skating Federation of Russia.

Schedule
Listed in local time (UTC+03:00).

Preliminary entries
The Figure Skating Federation of Russia published the official list of participants on 14 January 2022.

Changes to preliminary entries

Results

Men

Women

Pairs

Ice dance

International team selections

Winter Universiade
The 2021 Winter Universiade, originally scheduled for 21–31 January 2021 in Lucerne, Switzerland, was postponed to 11–21 December 2021 but finally it was cancelled definitively on 29 November 2021.

European Championships
The 2022 European Championships were held in Tallinn, Estonia from 10 to 16 January 2022. Russia's team was published on 26 December 2021.

Winter Olympics
The 2022 Winter Olympics was held in Beijing, China from 4 to 20 February 2022. Russia's team was published on 20 January 2022.

European Youth Olympic Winter Festival
The 2022 European Youth Olympic Winter Festival, originally scheduled for 6–13 February 2021 in Vuokatti, Finland, was postponed to 11–18 December 2021 and then to 20–25 March 2022. However, on 2 March 2022, in accordance with a recommendation by the International Olympic Committee (IOC), European Olympic Committees (EOC) suspended the participation of Russia from 2022 European Youth Olympic Winter Festival due to the 2022 Russian invasion of Ukraine.

World Championships
The 2022 World Championships were held in Montpellier, France from 21 to 27 March 2022. However, on 1 March 2022, in accordance with a recommendation by the International Olympic Committee (IOC), the International Skating Union (ISU) banned figure skaters and officials from Russia from attending all international competitions due to the 2022 Russian invasion of Ukraine.

World Junior Championships
Commonly referred to as "Junior Worlds", the 2022 World Junior Championships were originally scheduled for 7–13 March 2022 in Sofia, Bulgaria before postponing to 13–17 April 2022 in Tallinn, Estonia. However, on 1 March 2022, in accordance with a recommendation by the International Olympic Committee (IOC), the International Skating Union (ISU) banned figure skaters and officials from Russia from attending all international competitions due to the 2022 Russian invasion of Ukraine.

References 

Russian Figure Skating Championships
Russian Championships
Russian Championships
Figure Skating Championships
Figure Skating Championships